Music for People may refer to:
Music for People (album), a 2000 album by the band VAST
Music for People (organization), a non-profit organization dedicated to music-making and music improvisation as a means of self-expression